The 2004 Wyoming Cowboys football team represented the University of Wyoming in the 2004 NCAA Division I-A football season. The Cowboys offense scored 318 points while the defense allowed 297 points. Led by head coach Joe Glenn, the Cowboys competed in the Las Vegas Bowl.

Preseason
During the off season, War Memorial Stadium was upgraded with new railings installed in certain areas as well as more handicap accessible.

The big concern coming into Spring Training was the lack of depth on defense, a young and inexperienced offensive line and a poor running game. 13 Starters and 38 lettermen returned.

Fall practice began on August 11, 2004. The Cowboys participated in two inter squad scrimmages. The first one was held August 21 and the second one was 5 days later on the 26th.

Players

Quarterbacks
Corey Bramlet replaced his older brother, Casey, who graduate the previous season.

Schedule

References

Wyoming Cowboys
Wyoming Cowboys football seasons
Las Vegas Bowl champion seasons
Wyoming Cowboys football